In Australian industrial law, unfair dismissal refers to an unlawful act of employment termination due to it being an unfair action on the employee by the employer.

History 
The ability for an individual to seek relief from unfair dismissal was first established in a statutory scheme in South Australia in 1972, followed thereafter by Western Australia, Queensland, New South Wales and Victoria in the early 1990s.

Protection from unfair dismissal at the Commonwealth level was enhanced in 1984 by the Commonwealth Conciliation and Arbitration Commission with its ruling in the Termination, Change and Redundancy Case, that awards should contain a provision that dismissal "shall not be harsh, unjust or unreasonable" and subsequent awards following it were upheld by the High Court of Australia. The Parliament of Australia later extended the reach of protection from unfair dismissal with the passage of the Industrial Relations Reform Act 1993, which relied upon the external affairs power and the ILO Termination of Employment Convention, 1982.

Contemporary law

Commonwealth jurisdiction

Unfair dismissal findings 
Unfair dismissal will be found to have occurred where the Fair Work Commission, acting under section 385 of the Fair Work Act 2009, determines that:

 a person has been dismissed;
 the dismissal was harsh, unjust or unreasonable;
 it was not consistent with the Small Business Fair Dismissal Code; and
 it was not a case of genuine redundancy.

If the Fair Work Commission determines that a dismissal was unfair, the Commission must decide whether to order reinstatement or compensation. The Commission is required to first consider whether reinstatement is appropriate and can only order compensation (capped at 6 months pay) if it is satisfied that reinstatement is inappropriate.

Coverage 
In general, people covered by unfair dismissal laws are those who have worked more than six months for an employer (or more than one year for a small business employer), for which one or more or the following conditions must apply:

 a modern award covers the person;
 an enterprise agreement applies to the person in relation to the employment;
 the person's annual rate of earnings is determined to be less than the high income threshold.

The scope of coverage is quite broad. The Commonwealth has declared that all employers falling within its jurisdiction are subject to the scheme, including:

 The Commonwealth and its authorities
 Those corporations falling within its corporations power
 Those who hire waterside employees, maritime employees, and flight crew officers in interstate or overseas trade or commerce
 All employers in the Australian Capital Territory and the Northern Territory (except for members of the Northern Territory Police), as well as the external territories of Norfolk Island, Christmas Island and the Cocos (Keeling) Islands

In addition, the States have delegated certain classes of employers by virtue of the Constitution's referral power:

State jurisdiction 
Where the Fair Work Act does not apply, relief from unfair dismissal may arise under State laws. In Western Australia, recourse may be available from the Western Australian Industrial Relations Commission.

See also 
 Wrongful dismissal

References

Further reading 
 
 

Employment in Australia